The Southern cut-throat eel (Histiobranchus australis) is an eel in the family Synaphobranchidae (cutthroat eels). It was described by Regan in 1913. It is a marine, deep water-dwelling eel which is known from the southern Atlantic, Indian, and Pacific Ocean.

References

Synaphobranchidae
Fish described in 1913